Take Command may refer to:

 Take Command (command line interpreter), a cmd.exe replacement by JP Software
 Take Command Console, a later version of the command line interpreter
 Take Command (computer game), a 2006 computer game by MadMinute Games